Our Planet is a British nature documentary series made for Netflix. The series is narrated by David Attenborough and produced by Silverback Films, led by Alastair Fothergill and Keith Scholey, who also created BBC documentary series Planet Earth, Frozen Planet and The Blue Planet, in collaboration with the conservation charity World Wildlife Fund (WWF). Music composed by award-winning composer Steven Price.

The series addresses issues of conservation while featuring these desperate animals in their respective home regions, and has been noted for its greater focus on humans' impact on the environment than traditional nature documentaries, centering around how climate change impacts all living creatures. It is the first nature documentary Netflix has ever made. All episodes were released on 5 April 2019. A behind-the-scenes documentary was released onto Netflix on 2 August 2019. Netflix reported that 25 million households were expected to watch the series during its first month of release. It was later reported that 100 million households had watched the series as of March 2021.

A second season is set for a 2023 release.

Production
On 15 April 2015, it was announced that the team behind the BBC nature series Planet Earth would produce an eight-part nature docu-series for Netflix that would be released in 2019. It was four years in the making and was filmed in 50 countries, and over 600 crew members took part in the production. The series focuses on the breadth of the diversity of habitats around the world, including the Arctic wilderness, the deep sea, the vast landscapes of Africa and the diverse jungles of South America.

In November 2018, David Attenborough was announced as the narrator, with the release date of 5 April 2019 also announced.

Promotion
The series premiere was held on 4 April 2019, at the Natural History Museum in London. Guests at the premiere included Prince Charles and his two sons Prince William and Prince Harry, Charlie Brooker, David Beckham and his son Brooklyn Beckham, Ellie Goulding and the series narrator David Attenborough, who attended the event to underline their support for action against climate change.

In his speech, Prince Charles said he hoped “Our Planet” would educate hundreds of millions of people around the world about what action was required, while David Attenborough called on the world to "be responsible careful citizens of this planet which is our only home, and for the creatures that live in it."

The first teaser trailer for "Our Planet" was released on 8 November 2018. Three months later, on 4 February 2019, the second teaser trailer was released. On 19 March 2019, the official trailer for the documentary was released.

Episodes

A 1 hour long bonus episode "Our Planet - Behind The Scenes" about the project is accessible under Additional Videos on Netflix.

Reception

The review aggregator website Rotten Tomatoes reported an approval rating of 93% based on 27 reviews, and an average rating of 8.33/10. The website's critical consensus reads, "A cornucopia of visual wonder and environmental advocacy, Our Planets breathtaking cinematography explores more of this beautiful, blue marble while presenting an urgent call to action to its inhabitants" Metacritic, which uses a weighted average, assigned the film a score of 88 out of 100, based on 7 critics, indicating "universal acclaim".

Lucy Mangan of The Guardian gave out 4 out of 5 stars to Our Planet, saying "it places clearer emphasis on the fragility and interconnectedness of all the species and eco-systems on display, and on the huge impact, humanity has had on them in so short a time. Bryan Resnick of Vox praised the series as "can’t really describe the scale of what’s missing" stating "It reminds us we’re living in an age of staggering wildlife loss due to human development, over-fishing, deforestation, and climate change. This series doesn’t let us forget that. Humans have caused staggering amounts of wildlife loss. Our Planet doesn’t hide from it." Ben Travers of Indie Wire gave out an overall B+ for the series, and claims that the series ruthlessly contrasts the world's natural wonders with the environmental crisis killing them off, he wrote "Their deaths are a warning for the darkness underlying all of Our Planet, a nature docuseries no longer content with passive commentary. It also offers all the stunning imagery you’ve come to expect from these documentarians, but its attitude may surprise you. Individual entries feel a little less memorable because of it. The light, comic touches that made for lovely little moments in Planet Earth are overshadowed if not spoiled entirely, by the traumatic lessons put front and centre."

Will Gompertz of BBC also handed out a 4 out of 5 stars for the series, stating it "gives us some of the most dazzling images you are ever likely to view on TV. When necessary, they are embellished with Attenborough's commentary, which is never obtrusive and always written with brevity and wit...It has been created by masters of their craft with an exceptional narrator, I do wonder, though, if the experienced executive producers at BBC would have sharpened up the first episode a little." Stuart McGurk of British GQ said "It’s hard not to see this as a direct rebuke of the BBC’s nature documentaries: take one well-worn spectacular of the natural world, shoot it even more spectacularly than the BBC ever did and structure your whole opening episode around the idea that, without taking things like global warming seriously – without putting it front and centre about any show you’re making about the natural world, because how could you not – then pretty soon they’ll be nothing left to film so beautifully." Kevin Yeoman of Screen Rant concluded the series as "stunningly ambitious", he wrote "Where Our Planet excels [Planet Earth and Blue Planet], though, is in its presentation. It’s not trying to convince anyone of anything — the time for doing that is long past. It’s simply stating this information as fact, in as straightforward a manner as possible. Not that it’s particularly difficult considering the evidence the series has on hand."

However, Ed Power of The Telegraph criticized the documentary series as "visually dazzling but very familiar." and gave it a 3 out of 5 stars, writing "It is clichéd in its portrayal of life on earth as a slow-motion ballet of tooth and claw....In short, the innovations that made Attenborough’s previous series so sensational are conspicuously absent. It’s a haunting vision. More of this and Our Planet might have been a meaningful addition to the canon of natural history series. Instead, it prioritizes cinematic grandeur to an almost oppressive degree." Writing in The Independent, Lucy Jones stated that the most important aspect of the series, which set it apart from other nature documentaries of its type, was the depictions of the harsh realities of global warming, mass species extinction and environmental degradation which were woven into the narration that accompanied the breathtaking scenes and imagery, but she also argues it did not go far enough and should have been more radical given current ecological crises. In particular, she says the program should have called out those responsible for this ecocide. When Attenborough's narration tells the audience "We have destroyed half the forests on earth", she retorts "But, who is we? As well as the fossil fuel industry, where is the fishing industry? Agriculture? The plastics industry? The vested interests that keep the planet burning? Yes, we are all complicit – those of us in affluent societies with high-consumption lifestyles more so than anyone – but there are greater powers at work. Describing the scale of the challenge is necessary but I wanted the series to go further, to peer under the hood."

Soundtrack

The soundtrack was released with a compilation of the incidental music specially commissioned for Our Planet. The theme song "In This Together", which is a collaboration with English singer and songwriter Ellie Goulding, is also included.

Broadcast
Starting from 20 June 2020, the series was aired on Indonesian television network TVRI as a part of Belajar dari Rumah (Study from Home) programming block, made possible by a partnership between the Ministry of Education and Culture and Netflix. The broadcast marked the first Netflix original documentary series ever aired on conventional television, alongside a collection of Netflix documentaries included in the partnership.

During the COVID-19 pandemic, Netflix has made the series available for free streaming on YouTube as an educational resource.

See also
Environmental stewardship

References

External links

 Full episodes on YouTube
 
 
The Disturbing Walrus Scene in Our Planet. The Atlantic. 8 April 2019

2010s British documentary television series
2019 British television series debuts
2019 British television series endings
British television documentaries
David Attenborough
Documentary films about nature
English-language Netflix original programming
Netflix original documentary television series
Documentary films about environmental issues
Documentary films about global warming